The Seaside may refer to:

The Seaside (Waterford, Connecticut), a historic building designed by Cass Gilbert
The Seaside (album), an album by English rock group Cardiacs, or its expanded reissue, The Seaside: Original Edition
 The Seaside EP, an EP by Chicago artist Owen
Seaside resort, a resort on or near a sea coast

See also
Seaside (disambiguation)